Suzanne E. Dunkley Zandvoort (born 28 March 1956) is a Bermudian equestrian who competed at the 1992 Summer Olympics and the 1996 Summer Olympics.

References

External links
 

1956 births
Living people
Bermudian female equestrians
Bermudian dressage riders
Olympic equestrians of Bermuda
Equestrians at the 1992 Summer Olympics
Equestrians at the 1996 Summer Olympics
Place of birth missing (living people)